Grimm's law (also known as the First Germanic Sound Shift) is a set of sound laws describing the Proto-Indo-European (PIE) stop consonants as they developed in Proto-Germanic in the 1st millennium BC. First systematically put forward by Jacob Grimm but previously remarked upon by Rasmus Rask, it establishes a set of regular correspondences between early Germanic stops and fricatives and stop consonants of certain other centum Indo-European languages.

History

Grimm's law was the first discovery of a systematic sound change, and it led to the creation of historical phonology as a separate discipline of historical linguistics. The correspondence between Latin p and Germanic f was first noted by Friedrich von Schlegel in 1806. In 1818, Rasmus Rask extended the correspondences to other Indo-European languages such as Sanskrit and Greek, and to the full range of consonants involved. In 1822, Jacob Grimm put forth the rule in his book Deutsche Grammatik and extended it to include standard German. He noticed that there were many words which had different consonants from what his law predicted, and these exceptions defied linguists for several decades, until they eventually received explanation from Danish linguist Karl Verner in the form of Verner's law.

Overview
Grimm's law consists of three parts which form consecutive phases in the sense of a chain shift. The phases are usually constructed as follows:

 Proto-Indo-European voiceless stops change into voiceless fricatives.
 Proto-Indo-European voiced stops become voiceless stops.
 Proto-Indo-European voiced aspirated stops become voiced stops or fricatives (as allophones).

This chain shift (in the order 3,2,1) can be abstractly represented as:

  →  →  → 
  →  →  → 
  →  →  → 
  →  →  → 

Here each sound moves one position to the right to take on its new sound value.

The exact details of the shift are unknown, and it may have progressed in a variety of ways before arriving at the final situation. The three stages listed above show the progression of a "pull chain", in which each change leaves a "gap" in the phonological system that "pulls" other phonemes into it to fill the gap. But it is also conceivable that the shift happened as a “push chain”, where the changes happened in reverse order, with each change "pushing" the next forward to avoid merging the phonemes.

The steps could also have occurred somewhat differently. Another possible sequence of events could have been:

 Voiceless stops are allophonically aspirated under most conditions.
 Voiced stops become unaspirated voiceless stops.
 All aspirated stops become fricatives.

This sequence would lead to the same result. This variety of Grimm's law is often suggested in the context of the glottalic theory of Proto-Indo-European, which is followed by a minority of linguists. This theoretical framework assumes that "voiced stops" in PIE were actually voiceless to begin with, so that the second phase did not actually exist as such, or was not actually devoicing but a loss of some other articulatory feature such as glottalization or ejectiveness. This alternative sequence also accounts for the phonetics of Verner's law (see below), which are easier to explain within the glottalic theory framework when Grimm's law is formulated in this manner. Additionally, a change from aspirated stops to fricatives is known to have happened in the transition between Proto-Indo-European and Proto-Italic, so represents a plausible potential change from Proto-Indo-European to Proto-Germanic.

Further changes

Once the changes described by Grimm's law had taken place, there was only one type of voiced consonant, with no distinction between voiced stops and voiced fricatives. They eventually became stops at the beginning of a word (for the most part), as well as after a nasal consonant, but fricatives elsewhere. Whether they were plosives or fricatives at first is therefore not clear. The voiced aspirated stops may have first become voiced fricatives, before hardening to stops under certain conditions. But they may also have become stops at first, softening to fricatives in most positions later.

Around the same time as the Grimm's law adjustments took place, another change occurred known as Verner's law. Verner's law caused, under certain conditions, the voicing of the voiceless fricatives that resulted from the Grimm's law changes, creating apparent exceptions to the rule. For example:

 Proto-Indo-European *bʰréh₂tēr ("brother") > Proto-Germanic *brōþēr (Old English broþor, Old High German bruothar/bruodar)
 Proto-Indo-European *ph₂tḗr ("father") > Proto-Germanic *faðēr (Old English fæder, Old High German fatar)

Here, the same sound *t appears as *þ  in one word (following Grimm's law), but as *d  in another (apparently violating Grimm's law). See the Verner's law article for a more detailed explanation of this discrepancy.

The early Germanic *gw that had arisen from Proto-Indo-European  (and from  through Verner's law) underwent further changes of various sorts:

 After *n it was preserved as a labiovelar stop *gw, but later changed to a plain velar *g in West Germanic.
 Following vowels, it seems to have become *w, presumably through a fricative stage *ɣʷ.
 Word-initially, the most plausible reflex is a labiovelar stop *gʷ at first, but the further development is unclear. In that position, it became either *w, *g or *b during late Proto-Germanic.
 The regular reflex next to *u would likely have been *g, due to loss of the labial element before a labial vowel in Proto-Indo-European, which continued to act as a surface filter. (See boukólos rule)

Perhaps the usual reflex was *b (as suggested by the connection of bid < *bidjaną and Old Irish guidid), but *w appears in certain cases (possibly through dissimilation when another labial consonant followed?), such as in warm and wife (provided that the proposed explanations are correct). Proto-Germanic *hw voiced by Verner's law fell together with this sound and developed identically, compare the words for 'she-wolf': from Middle High German wülbe and Old Norse ylgr, one can reconstruct Proto-Germanic nominative singular *wulbī, genitive singular *wulgijōz, from earlier *wulgwī, *wulgwijōz.

Examples

Further changes following Grimm's law, as well as sound changes in other Indo-European languages, can occasionally obscure its own effects. The most illustrative examples are used here.

 Some linguists dispute the origin of the word "scold", but Julius Pokorny, among others, proposed *skʷetlo as the assumed root.
 Several languages, including English, later underwent an unrelated change  >  (or >  in the case of Dutch).

Examples with following *t:

 Icelandic nótt  comes from Old Norse nǫ́tt, nátt, from Proto-Germanic *naht-. The Germanic *ht regularly becomes tt in Old Norse, and this then becomes preaspirated in Icelandic.

Correspondences to PIE
The Germanic "sound laws", combined with regular changes reconstructed for other Indo-European languages, allow one to define the expected sound correspondences between different branches of the family. For example, Germanic (word-initial) *b- corresponds regularly to Latin *f-, Greek , Sanskrit , Slavic, Baltic or Celtic b-, etc., while Germanic *f- corresponds to Latin, Greek, Sanskrit, Slavic and Baltic p- and to zero (no initial consonant) in Celtic. The former set goes back to PIE * (faithfully reflected in Sanskrit and modified in various ways elsewhere), and the latter set to PIE *p- (shifted in Germanic, lost in Celtic, but preserved in the other groups mentioned here).

One of the more conspicuous present surface correspondences is the English digraph wh and the corresponding Latin and Romance digraph qu, notably found in interrogative words (wh-words) such as the five Ws. The present pronunciations have undergone further sound changes, such as wh-cluster reductions in many varieties of English, though the spellings reflect the history more; see Interrogative word: Etymology for details.

See also
 High German consonant shift
 Glottalic theory
 The Tuscan gorgia, a similar evolution differentiating the Tuscan dialects from Standard Italian.
 The Uralic Hungarian language was also affected by a similar process, leading to a high frequency of f and h, and can be compared to Finnish, which did not change this way.
 Armenian, another Indo-European language, has experienced a similar evolution.
 Stigler's law of eponymy

References

External links
Grimm's law at Encyclopædia Britannica

Sound laws
Germanic language histories
History of the English language
History of the German language
History of the Dutch language
Proto-Indo-European language